Pootan may refer to:

 A character from Japanese manga and anime series Cromartie High School
 An unauthorised bootleg version of Japanese arcade game Pooyan